Sar Ziarat (also Romanized as Sar Zīārat) is a village in Qilab Rural District, Alvar-e Garmsiri District, Andimeshk County, Khuzestan Province, Iran. At the 2006 census, its population was 20, in 6 families.

References 

Populated places in Andimeshk County